= Discover Syria Rally =

The Discover Syria Rally (Arabic: رالي اكتشف سوريا) is an annual rally, organized by the Syrian Automobile Club in 2003. The rally is open to amateur and professional entries. It is about 1300 km long, where the contestants drive between Syrian cities. The event has not been held since 2009.
